Following is a list of senators of Savoie, people who have represented the department of Savoie in the Senate of France.

Third Republic

Senators for Savoie under the French Third Republic were:

Fourth Republic

Senators for Savoie under the French Fourth Republic were:

Fifth Republic 
Senators for Savoie under the French Fifth Republic:

References

Sources

 
Lists of members of the Senate (France) by department